The Society Management is a model management company based in New York City, and is the official U.S. division of the Elite World network. It is also the U.S. branch of the Elite Model Look contest.

Models
The following models & talent are currently represented by The Society Management:

 Adesuwa Aighewi
 Adut Akech
 Bhumika Arora
 Yoon Young Bae
 Molly Bair
 Julia Banaś
 Ruth and May Bell
 Kate Bock
 Cindy Bruna
 Vittoria Ceretti
 Angus Cloud
 Aiden Curtiss
 Grace Elizabeth
 Cora Emmanuel
 Amilna Estêvão
 Faretta
 Luma Grothe
 Greta Hofer
 Jacquelyn Jablonski
 Kendall Jenner
 HoYeon Jung
 Karlie Kloss
 Kōki
 Birgit Kos
 Harleth Kuusik
 Francisco Lachowski
 Staz Lindes
 Yuka Mannami
 Nina Marker
 Kelsey Merritt
 Enikő Mihalik
 Rawdah Mohamed
 Mayowa Nicholas
 Caroline Brasch Nielsen
 Yumi Nu
 Natalie Ogg
 Tao Okamoto
 Africa Peñalver
 Allison Ponthier
 Ansolet Rossouw
 Calu Rivero
 Camille Rowe
 Jasmine Sanders
 Mika Schneider
 Irina Shayk
 Josephine Skriver
 Lucky Blue Smith
 Willow Smith
 Arlenis Sosa
 Fran Summers
 Marlon Teixeira
 Phoebe Tonkin
 Mona Tougaard
 Caroline Trentini
 Amber Valletta
 Greta Varlese
 Sara Grace Wallerstedt
 Liu Wen
 Russell Westbrook
 Nathan Westling
 Yasmin Wijnaldum
 Tami Williams
 Lindsey Wixson

See also
 List of modeling agencies

References

External links
The Society Management Official Website
The Society Management on Models.com
Elite Model World

Talent agencies
Modeling agencies
Companies based in New York (state)
American companies established in 2012
Entertainment companies established in 2012